The Flirt is a 1917 American short comedy film featuring Harold Lloyd. Copies of the film survive in the film archives of the Museum of Modern Art and the British Film Institute.

Plot
Harold Lloyd plays an incorrigible skirt-chaser who follows a pretty girl from a park to her place of employment as a cashier in a restaurant.  He orders a huge meal and then proceeds to get the waiter fired so he can take his place.  In a short time Lloyd creates mayhem that annoys both the restaurant's customers and its kitchen staff.  Lloyd eventually learns that the cashier is married to the proprietor of the restaurant.  He then quickly leaves, sees another pretty girl, and follows her down the street.

Cast

Reception
Like many American films of the time, The Flirt was subject to cuts by city and state film censorship boards. For example, the Chicago Board of Censors cut the scene of the waiter wiping a tray and his feet on the cook's posterior.

See also
 List of American films of 1917
 Harold Lloyd filmography

References

External links

1917 films
1917 short films
1917 comedy films
American silent short films
American black-and-white films
Silent American comedy films
Censored films
American comedy short films
Surviving American silent films
1910s American films
1910s English-language films